Rajim is one of the 90 Legislative Assembly constituencies of Chhattisgarh state in India. It is in Gariaband district and is a segment of Mahasamund Lok Sabha constituency.

Members of Vidhan Sabha
As part of Madhya Pradesh Legislative Assembly

As part of Chhattisgarh Legislative Assembly

^ bypoll

Election results

2018

See also
 Rajim
 Gariaband district
 List of constituencies of Chhattisgarh Legislative Assembly

References

Gariaband district
Assembly constituencies of Chhattisgarh